Sphaeropteris medullaris,  synonym Cyathea medullaris, commonly known as mamaku or black tree fern, is a large tree fern up to 20 m tall. It is distributed across the south-west Pacific from Fiji to Pitcairn Island. Its other Māori names include katātā, kōrau, or pītau.

Distribution

Sphaeropteris medullaris is common in lowland forest throughout the North Island of New Zealand. In the South Island its distribution is more localised. It is fairly common in wetter coastal areas, but rare in the drier eastern parts and absent in Canterbury and Otago. In New Zealand it also occurs on the Three Kings Islands in the far north, on Stewart Island/Rakiura in the far south and in the Chatham Islands.

Its distribution also includes Fiji, the Marquesas Islands, Tahiti, the Austral Islands, and Pitcairn Island. It is not present in the Kermadecs.

Description

The trunk is black and covered with distinctive hexagonal stipe bases. The fronds may be up to 5 m long, and arch upwards from the crown. Dead fronds are shed except in very young plants. The primary pinnae are from 40 cm to 1 m long, and the undersides have scales with spines along their margins. As many as 40,000 leaflets have been counted on a single frond. The stipes are thick, black, very rough to the touch, and are similarly covered in black scales with marginal spines. S. medullaris can be readily distinguished from related species by the hexagonal stipe scars on the trunk, and by the scales with spines on their margins.

Cultivation

Sphaeropteris medullaris will grow from fresh spores, but this is slow. Plants are easy to transplant when they are young. It is also possible to plant newly felled trunks which will generally sprout again, provided they are watered with care. They are hardy in various conditions once established. It has gained the Royal Horticultural Society's Award of Garden Merit as an ornamental.

Uses
Tree fern trunks, including those of S. medullaris, have been used as rough building material and also for makeshift trackwork.

The 1889 book The Useful Native Plants of Australia records that Indigenous Australians ate the pith of this fern tree which contained a certain amount of starch similar to sago.

References

Bibliography 
 C.Michael Hogan. 2010. Fern. Encyclopedia of Earth. eds. Saikat Basu and C.Cleveland. National Council for Science and the Environment. Washington DC.

medullaris
Ferns of Australasia
Ferns of Oceania
Ferns of New Zealand
Flora of the Tubuai Islands
Trees of New Zealand
Trees of mild maritime climate
Garden plants of New Zealand
Ornamental trees